The Randall Library is a public library at 19 Crescent Street in Stow, Massachusetts. In 1851 John Witt Randall, a notable naturalist, poet, and art collector, donated his collection of 700 books to form a library and left a bequest in his will to construct the current library building and to fund a permanent trust. The library building was designed by the architect George G. Adams and built in 1893 by the contractor, A. P. Powers. A large addition was built  in 1976. The library is part of the Minuteman Library Network.

See also

John Witt Randall

References

External links
Official website

Public libraries in Massachusetts
Libraries in Middlesex County, Massachusetts